Markos Kyprianou (born 22 January 1960) is a Cypriot politician who served as a Minister of Foreign Affairs until his official resignation on 19 July 2011, following the events of the Evangelos Florakis Naval Base explosion. A member of the Democratic Party, he was formerly Cyprus's Finance Minister and the European Commissioner for Health. He tendered his resignation as Commissioner on 29 February 2008 to become Foreign Minister in the government of newly elected President Dimitris Christofias; the resignation took effect on 3 March 2008, when his successor, Androulla Vassiliou, was confirmed as Commissioner.

Biography
Born in Limassol, Kyprianou is the younger son of Spyros Kyprianou, who was President of Cyprus from 1977 to 1988, and former Cypriot First Lady Mimi Kyprianou.

He studied law at the Law School of the University of Athens and at Trinity College, Cambridge, where he specialised in international law and tax law and was awarded a master's degree in Law (LLM). He earned a second master's degree in law, specialising in Company Law and Taxation, at Harvard Law School. He continued his academic career as a trainee at the Human Rights Commission of the Council of Europe and by carrying out research in international law at the University of Cambridge.

As a commissioner, one of his policies was the promotion of warnings on tobacco packets, with the Commission moving towards pictorial warnings. Following several European Union member states enacting bans on smoking in public places Kyprianou proposed a plan for an EU-wide ban of that kind. In May 2007, Kyprianou released a paper to tackle the shortage of organ donation in the Union. The plan included promotion, specially trained medical staff and an EU wide organ donor card.
Markos Kyprianou was officially charged on 24 January 2012, together with seven other persons, by the Attorney General of the Republic of Cyprus in relation to the Mari blast.

On 9 July 2013, a Cyprus Criminal Court found Markos Kyprianou innocent and acquitted him of all charges. On 9 February 2014, Kyprianou staged a political comeback as he was elected Deputy President of the Democratic Party in Cyprus.

Professional C.V. 
 since 1985 practising law
 1985–1991 associate with the law firm of Antis Triantafyllides & Sons
 1991–1995 partner with the law firm of Kyprianou & Boyiadjis
 1995– 2003 partner with the law firm of George L. Savvides & Co (merged with Kyprianou & Boyiadjis)

Political C.V. 
 1986–1991 Municipal Councillor for the City of Nicosia
 1993–1997 President of the Youth Organization of the Democratic Party
 since 1986 Member of the Central Committee of the Democratic Party (DIKO)
 since 1990 Member of the Political Committee of the Party
 1993–1998 and 2001 Member of the Executive Bureau of the Party
 1991–2003 Member of the House of Representatives for the Nicosia District
 1999–2003 Chairman of the House Committee on Financial and Budgetary Affairs
 1 March 2003 – 30 April 2004, Minister of Finance
 from 1 May 2004 - 3 March 2008. Member of the European Commission, (since November 2004 responsible for Health and Consumer Protection)
 from 3 March 2008 – 5 August 2011, Minister of Foreign Affairs.
 since 9 February 2014, Deputy President of Democratic Party.

Memberships
 American Bar Association (associate member)
 Harvard Law School Association of Europe
 International Bar Association
 Cyprus Red Cross Society

References

External links
 Official website

|-

|-

|-

|-

|-

1960 births
Alumni of Trinity College, Cambridge
Cypriot European Commissioners
20th-century Cypriot lawyers
Cyprus Ministers of Finance
Cyprus Ministers of Foreign Affairs
Greek Cypriot people
Harvard Law School alumni
Living people
People from Limassol
National and Kapodistrian University of Athens alumni
Democratic Party (Cyprus) politicians
Children of national leaders
21st-century Cypriot lawyers